Transonic Combustion Inc. is a Los Angeles-based cleantech company that is developing supercritical fuel injection systems that enable injection ignition in internal combustion engines.

On October 25, 2010, Transonic presented a technical paper detailing its novel injection ignition combustion process at the SAE 2010 Powertrain Fuels and Lubricants Meeting in San Diego CA.

On September 1, 2010, the World Economic Forum announced the company as a Technology Pioneer for 2011.

As of March 2015, Transonic's website was defunct, and in April 2015 the facilities were up for auction.

References

"10 Green Car Technologies to Watch". Forbes 19 March 2008
"Companies to watch in green tech transportation". CNET 21 April 2008
Brian Ahlborn Joins Transonic Combustion as President and CEO. Business Wire 11 December 2008
"Governor Granholm Announces New Investing and Jobs in Michigan". MEDC 14 April 2009
"Shaping the Future: 40 Years of Innovation". Venrock 19 May 2009
Transonic Combustion Completes New Round of Venture Funding. Business Wire 6 May 2009
"Beyond Detroit: On the Road to Recovery, Let the Little Guys Drive". Wired Magazine 22 May 2009
"New Technology Innovation for Two Liter Car". Wirtschaftswoche (German) 17 July 2009
Video: Transonic board member Vinod Khosla equates cleantech with the internal combustion engine. Washington Post 28 July 2009
“Capps, local leaders push clean energy bill”. Ventura County Star 16 September 2009
“Disruptive Technologies in Transport Fuels: Transonic Combustion Case Study” (available on Transonic's website). Accenture 10 November 2009
“How Greener Cars & Smarter Transit Fit Into COP15”. Earth2Tech 1 December 2009
Highlighting Transonic Combustion, “It will be easier, cheaper, and more globally beneficial to cut the fuel consumption of the internal-combustion engine in half”. Motor Trend January 2010
"Supercritical fuel injection and combustion". SAE Automotive Engineering International 11 January 2010
"Top Picks from the ARPA-E Summit: Novel technologies from the energy agency's first conference". MIT Technology Review 3 March 2010
“Transonic Exhibits at Department of Energy’s ARPA-E Innovation Summit; Supercritical Fuel System Can Improve Fuel Economy Between 50-75%”. Green Car Congress 4 March 2010
“Ultra-Efficient Gas Engine Passes Test with a Novel Fuel Injection System”. MIT Technology Review 8 March 2010
“Local startup's aim is better use of fuel: Company has caught the eye of automakers”. Ventura County Star 3 April 2010
“Transonic Combustion Welcomes Powertrain Veteran Donald Runkle to its Board of Directors”. PR Newswire 20 May 2010
“Robert Lutz Joins Transonic Combustion's Board of Directors”. PR Newswire 24 May 2010
“Innovation: Taking Aim at Gas Guzzlers”. Inc. Magazine 1 June 2010

External links
 

Automotive companies of the United States